Fernanda Lujan Insfrán Mora (born 7 February 1998) is a Paraguayan handball player for the Paraguay national team.

She was selected to represent Paraguay at the 2017 World Women's Handball Championship.

Individual Awards and recognitions
2016 Pan American Women's Junior Handball Championship: Top scorer

References

1998 births
Living people
Paraguayan female handball players
Expatriate handball players
Paraguayan expatriate sportspeople in Spain
20th-century Paraguayan women
21st-century Paraguayan women
South American Games medalists in handball
South American Games silver medalists for Paraguay
Competitors at the 2022 South American Games